Avinash Vyas was an Indian music composer, lyricist and singer of Gujarati films who composed music for over 190 Gujarati films. He was a winner of Gujarat State Film award for the best lyricist and best music 25 times. He was honoured by the Government of India in 1970 with Padma Shri, the fourth highest Indian civilian award.

Biography
Avinash Vyas was born in the Indian state of Gujarat on 21 July 1912 and had his initial music training under Ustad Allauddin Khan. His career started with HMV for their Young India label where he cut his first gramophone record in 1940 and debuted as a film music composer in with the Gujarati film, Mahasati Ansuya in 1943, partnering the renowned musician, Ustad Alla Rakha. Two more films were released the next year, Krishna Bhakta Bodana and Laheri Badmash but both were not successful. His first major hit came in 1948 with Gunsundari, a bilingual in Gujarati and Hindi.

Vyas composed music for over 1200 songs for 190 Hindi and Gujarati films during his career, his total contribution exceeding 10,000 songs including non film songs. Most of the major singers of that era such as Geeta Dutt, Mohammed Rafi, Lata Mangeshkar, Asha Bhosle, Suman Kalyanpur, Manna Dey, Mukesh, Hemant Kumar, Talat Mehmood, Kishore Kumar, Mahendra Kapoor and Usha Mangeshkar sang his compositions in various movies. He tuned the lines of several noted lyricists like Qamar Jalalabadi, Indeevar, Bharat Vyas and Raja Mehdi Ali Khan. Geeta Dutt was one of his favorite singers and she sang in more Gujarati films than in Bengali films where she originally came from.

Vyas received the Gujarat State annual Film awards 25 times, both for lyrics and compositions, which is reported to be a record. The Gujarat Rajya Sangeet Nrutya Academy awarded him the Gaurav Puraskar and the Government of India honoured him with the civilian award of Padma Shri in 1970. Some of his memorable compositions were compiled and released on 29 March 2012 as a music disc under the name, Avinash Vyas - A Musical Journey. He died on 20 August 1984, at the age of 72, three years after his last film, Bhakta Gora Kumbhar was released.

Notable songs

Filmography
Vyas is credited with over 190 films in Gujarati and Hindi.

 	Mahasati Ansuya (1943) 
 	Krishna Bhakta Bodana (1944) 
 	Laheri Badmash (1944) 
 	Gunsundari (1948)
 	Mangal Fera (1949)
 	Har Har Mahadev (1950) 
 	Veer Bhimsen (1950) 
 	Dashavtar (1951) 
 	Jai Mahalaxmi (1951) 
 	Ram Janma (1951) 
 	Shri Vishnu Bhagwan (1951) 
 	Rajrani Damyanti (1952) 
 	Shiv Shakti (1952) 
 	Vasna (1952) 
 	Bhagyawan (1953) 
 	Teen Batti Char Raasta (1953)
 	Chakradhari (1954) 
 	Maha Pooja (1954) 
 	Malika-E-Alam Noorjehan (1954)
 	Adhikaar (1954) 
 	Andher Nagri Choupat Raja (1955) 
 	Vaman Avtar (1955) 
 	Ekadashi (1955) 
 	Jagadguru Shankaracharya (1955) 
 	Riyasat (1955) 
 	Dwarikadheesh (1956) 
 	Sudarshan Chakra (1956) 
 	Lakshmi (1957) 
 	Naag Mani (1957) 
 	Ram Laxman (1957) 
 	Sant Raghu (1957) 
 	Aadhi Roti (1957) 
 	Gopichand (1958) 
 	Great Show of India (1958) 
 	Jung Bahadur (1958) 
 	Pati Parmeshwar (1958) 
 	Ram Bhakti (1958) 
 	Charnon Ki Dasi (1959) 
 	Grihalakshmi (1959)
 	Mehndi Rang Lagyo (1960) 
 	Bhakta Raj (1960) 
 	Heron Malaat (1961) 
 	Hawa Mahal (1962) 
 	Kailashpati (1962) 
 	Bapu Ne Kaha Tha (1962) 
 	Royal Mail (1963) 
 	Bhakta Dhruva Kumar (1964) 
 	Kalapi (1966)
 	Badmash (1969) 
 	Beti Tumhare Jaisi (1969) 
 	Surya Devata (1969) 
 	Taqat Aur Talwar (1970) 
 	Jesal Toraal (1971)
 	Maha Sati Savitri (1973) 
 	Daku Aur Bhagwan (1975) 
 	Son baini Chun Daadi (1976)
 	Maa Baap (1979) 
 	Bhakta Gora Kumbhar (1981)

See also

 Ustad Allauddin Khan
 Ustad Alla Rakha

References

External links
 
 

Recipients of the Padma Shri in arts
1912 births
1984 deaths
Musicians from Gujarat
Indian film score composers
Indian lyricists
Indian male playback singers
Gujarati playback singers
20th-century Indian composers
20th-century Indian singers
Indian male film score composers
20th-century Indian male singers